Aclophoropsis festiva is a species of minute sea snails in the family Triphoridae. They have left-handed shell-coiling, (adult size from 6 – 12 mm) with very high spires. They are found off southern  Australia.

References

Triphoridae
Gastropods described in 1851